Technicians of the Sacred: A Range of Poetries from Africa, America, Asia, Europe and Oceania is a book of spiritual writings and poetry collected from around the world. Compiled by Jerome Rothenberg 1969. .

See also

Monostich

Poetry collections
Books about spirituality